Apart from Life (translit. Chi no mure) is a 1970 Japanese drama film directed by Kei Kumai. It was entered into the 20th Berlin International Film Festival.

Cast
 Mizuho Suzuki as Unami
 Hiroko Kino as Noriko Fukuji
 Mugihito as Nobuo Tsuyama (as Makoto Terada)
 Sen Hara as Kaneyo, Nobuo's grandmother
 Tanie Kitabayashi as Matsuko Fukuji
 Noriko Matsumoto as Eiko, Unami's wife
 Tomoko Naraoka as Mitsuko
 Asao Sano as Yuji, Mitsuko's husband
 Jūkichi Uno as Shigeo Miyaji

References

External links

1970 films
1970 drama films
Japanese black-and-white films
Films directed by Kei Kumai
1970s Japanese-language films
Japanese drama films
1970s Japanese films